Kantaphon Wangcharoen (born 18 September 1998) is a Thai badminton player. At the young age, Wangcharoen became the runner-up in the senior tournament 2014 Singapore International in the men's singles event after losing the match because of foot injury. Wangcharoen clinched the bronze medal at the World Junior Championships in the boys' singles event, also part of the junior team that won the mixed team bronze in 2014 and 2016, and Asian mixed team bronze in 2016.

Wangcharoen was a member of the Thailand national team that won the bronze medals at the 2017, 2019 Southeast Asian Games and 2019 Sudirman Cup. He also the finalist at the BWF Grand Prix Gold event 2017 Thailand Masters, and won the 2017 National Championships title. 

At the 2018 Asian Games in Indonesia, Wangcharoen was criticized by the Thai media after he mocked and made fun of Indonesian fans in front of them by using offensive Thai language. He had recorded and published the offensive video clip on his personal Instagram account himself.

He ended the 2018 BWF season by qualified to compete at the World Tour Finals and catapulted him to a career-best world ranking of no. 15 at that year. He won the bronze medal at the 2019 BWF World Championships, becoming the first ever Thai player to win a World Championships medal in the men's singles event.

Achievements

BWF World Championships 
Men's singles

Southeast Asian Games 
Men's singles

BWF World Junior Championships 
Boys' singles

BWF Grand Prix (1 runner-up) 
The BWF Grand Prix had two levels, the Grand Prix and Grand Prix Gold. It was a series of badminton tournaments sanctioned by the Badminton World Federation (BWF) and played between 2007 and 2017.

Men's singles

  BWF Grand Prix Gold

BWF International Challenge/Series (1 runner-up) 
Men's singles

  BWF International Challenge tournament
  BWF International Series tournament
  BWF Future Series tournament

Record against selected opponents 
Record against Year-end Finals finalists, World Championships semi-finalists, and Olympic quarter-finalists. Accurate as of 22 December 2022.

References

External links 
 

Living people
1998 births
Kantaphon Wangcharoen
Kantaphon Wangcharoen
Badminton players at the 2020 Summer Olympics
Kantaphon Wangcharoen
Badminton players at the 2018 Asian Games
Kantaphon Wangcharoen
Competitors at the 2017 Southeast Asian Games
Competitors at the 2019 Southeast Asian Games
Kantaphon Wangcharoen
Southeast Asian Games medalists in badminton